Dongchon, also called myeon, was name of a historical township in the present day Dalseong County of North Gyeongsang province in South Korea. The area corresponds to the present day neighbourhoods (dong) of Dong District of Daegu metropolitan city in the southwestern part of Korean Peninsula. It was earlier known as the "Haean-myeon", which in 1940 was renamed to "Dongchon-myeon", and in 1958 it officially became one of the neighbourhoods of the expanding Daegu metropolitan city. The historic Town Office of Dongchon was located in the Ipseok-dong area, which is now crowded with people.

Communities

The historic Dongchon area corresponds to the following 6 present day neighbourhoods (dong) of Dong District of Daegu metropolitan city.

Attractions
Bongmu Leports Park
Otgol Village
Daegu International Airport

References

Dong District, Daegu
Former subdivisions of South Korea